We Are Northern Lights is a 2013 Scottish documentary film about the Scottish people, which was screened around Scotland. According to the BBC it was created using footage taken by over 100 members of the Scottish public during 2012. It is described as Scotland's first ever crowd sourced film project. It was shown at the Glasgow Film Festival in 2013 before being distributed to 5 Scottish Cineworld cinemas. It was also chosen as the opening film for the 2013 Glasgow Southside Film Festival.

References

External links
 
 
 Scotsman review

Scottish films
English-language Scottish films
Scottish culture
British documentary films
2013 films
2013 documentary films
Documentary films about Scotland
Scottish documentary films
2010s British films